A 100-year flood is a flood event that has a 1% probability of occurring in any given year.

100-year flood may also refer to:

Other uses 
Hundred Year Flood, an album by progressive metal band Magellan